The Grant Birthplace in Point Pleasant, Monroe Township, Ohio was the birthplace of U.S. President Ulysses S. Grant, who was born there in 1822. The home was built in 1817, and in 1821 Jesse Root Grant wed Hannah Simpson Grant (Ulysses's parents) and they moved into the home where they paid $2 a month rent.  The future president lived in Point Pleasant for less than a year, as his family moved to Georgetown one month before his first birthday.

The Ohio Historical Society operates the site as a historic house museum.  Today it is furnished with items that once belonged to Grant, as well as a few period items.  In 1998, the birthplace and several associated buildings were listed on the National Register of Historic Places as a historic district.

The Grant Birthplace and surrounding areas have been found to be a historical archaeological site.  As part of making the site ADA-compliant, a small-scale construction project in the summer of 2010 involved the replacement of stone gutters at the site.  Ohio State Historic Preservation Office staff archaeologists conducted a test excavation of some of the areas surrounding the gutters, discovering foundations of an 1810s tannery.

Previous archaeological work in and around the Grant Birthplace included the retrieval of early nineteenth-century pottery from a small midden being impacted by the replacement of a nearby bridge in 1984, as well as a field survey of open areas in the birthplace grounds before the construction of a small building at the site in 2005; the latter project recovered only a couple of insignificant lithic flakes from an unidentified prehistoric period.

See also
Grant Boyhood Home, Georgetown, Ohio
Ulysses S. Grant National Historic Site, near St. Louis
Ulysses S. Grant Home, Galena, Illinois
Grant Cottage State Historic Site, Mt. McGregor, New York
General Grant National Memorial (Grant's tomb)

References

External links
 Grant Birthplace

Archaeological sites in Ohio
Houses on the National Register of Historic Places in Ohio
Ulysses S. Grant
Historic districts on the National Register of Historic Places in Ohio
Museums in Clermont County, Ohio
National Register of Historic Places in Clermont County, Ohio
Presidential museums in Ohio
Historic house museums in Ohio
Presidential homes in the United States
Ohio History Connection
Houses completed in 1817
Houses in Clermont County, Ohio
Grant, Ulysses S
1817 establishments in Ohio